Brian Boru was High King of Ireland from 1002 to 1014.

Brian Boru may also refer to:
Brian Boru bagpipes, bagpipes based on the Great Highland bagpipe
Brian Boru (horse), a thoroughbred racehorse